Yondering is a collection of short stories by American author Louis L'Amour, published in 1980. A departure from L'Amour's traditional subject matter of the Old West, Yondering contains a mix of adventure stories and character studies, primarily set in the first half of the 20th century. Two of them are set during the World War II era, with many of the stories drawing upon the author's own life experiences. The book's publication celebrated the milestone of L'Amour having an estimated 100 million books in print at that time of publication.

A limited leather-bound hardcover edition was available direct from Bantam Books at the time of the first paperback publication in 1980.

The book was revised in 1989, with the primary difference the inclusion of some of L'Amour's previously unpublished short stories in a similar vein ; "Ruins of El Walarieh," "And Proudly Die," Show Me The Way Home," and "So You Want Adventure."  Excised was a "The Moon of the Trees Broken by Snow: A Christmas Story" which, according to the author's son Beau L'Amour, "never really belonged in this book."

List of Stories in the Original Edition, June 1980 
 Where There's Fighting
 The Dancing Kate
 Glorious! Glorious!
 Dead-End Drift
 Old Doc Yak
 Survival
 Thicker Than Blood
 The Admiral
 Shanghai, Not Without Gestures
 The Man Who Stole Shakespeare
 A Friend of the General
 Author's Tea
 A Moon of the Trees Broken By Snow: A Christmas Story
 Let Me Forget ... (poem)

List of Stories in the Revised Edition, November 1989 
 Where There's Fighting
 The Dancing Kate
 By the Ruins of El Walarieh
 Glorious! Glorious!
 Dead-End Drift
 Old Doc Yak
 Survival
 And Proudly Die
 Show Me the Way to Go Home
 Thicker Than Blood
 The Admiral
 Shanghai, Not Without Gestures
 The Man Who Stole Shakespeare
 A Friend of the General
 Author's Tea
 So You Want Adventure, Do You?
 Let Me Forget ... (poem)

Audio adaptations 

Three stories from Yondering have been released on audio cassette from Bantam Audio.

 Dead End Drift -read by Richard Crenna with an introduction by Louis L'Amour, 1987
 Old Doc Yak -read by Richard Crenna with an introduction by Louis L'Amour, 1987
 Survival -read by Richard Crenna with an introduction by Louis L'Amour, 1987

Footnotes 

1980 short story collections
Short story collections by Louis L'Amour